Vasilios Genitsaridis (born 16 February 1982) is a former professional footballer who played as a centre back and defensive midfielder for several clubs in Greece, including a stint with Apollon Kalamarias F.C. in the Alpha Ethniki.

Career
Born in Heraklion, Genitsaridis began playing football with local side Agios Nikolaos F.C. in the Beta Ethniki. In 2003, he signed with Apollon Kalamarias and helped the club gain promotion to the top flight, where he would make eight appearances during the following season.

In June 2010, Genitsaridis signed a two-year contract with Football League 2 side Panachaiki. He left the club six months later, and would finish his career with Olympiakos Chersonissos F.C. in 2011.

References

External links
Profile at EPAE.org
Guardian Football
Profile at Onsports.gr

1982 births
Living people
Agios Nikolaos F.C. players
Apollon Pontou FC players
Kalamata F.C. players
Olympiacos Volos F.C. players
Panachaiki F.C. players
Association football midfielders
Association football defenders
Footballers from Heraklion
Greek footballers